Hero is a 1983 Indian Hindi-language romantic action film directed by Subhash Ghai. Jackie Shroff played the lead role, and achieved stardom through this film. The actress Meenakshi Sheshadri, who had been Miss India in 1981 and played the lead female role gained popularity through this movie. The music was written by Laxmikant Pyarelal and songs are still popular. The movie was declared a blockbuster in the box office.

Hero was remade in Telugu as Vikram and in Kannada as Ranadheera. A Hindi remake was released in 2015 directed by Nikhil Advani. The film ranked third position in the Box Office collection list 1983.

Plot
The film starts with Pasha (Amrish Puri) being taken to prison. To get out of the situation, he writes to his best man, Jackie (Jackie Shroff). Jackie goes to Police Commissioner Shrikanth Mathur (Shammi Kapoor) and warns him. He then kidnaps Shrikanth's daughter Radha (Meenakshi Sheshadri). He tells her that he is a police officer and they fall in love; however, she finds out that he is a gangster but does not leave him and urges him to surrender. Transformed by true love, Jackie surrenders to the police and is imprisoned for two years.

Back home, Radha tells her brother Daamodar (Sanjeev Kumar) the truth. To prevent Radha from marrying somebody else, he calls his friend Jimmy (Shakti Kapoor) to put on a show that Radha and Jimmy love each other. Jimmy misunderstands the situation and falls in love with Radha. When Jackie comes back, he starts work in a garage and tries to reform himself. Despite everything, Shrikanth kicks him out of his life. After many days and events that follow, Daamodar finds out that Jimmy is a drug smuggler. After his release from prison, Pasha desires revenge against both Shrikanth and Jackie, so he kidnaps Radha, Shrikanth and Daamodar. Jackie comes at the last moment and frees all of them. In the end, Shrikanth lets Radha marry Jackie.

Cast
 Jackie Shroff as Jackie Dada / Jaikishan (dual role)
 Meenakshi Sheshadri as Radha Mathur
 Sanjeev Kumar as Damodar Mathur
 Shammi Kapoor as Police Commissioner Shrikanth Mathur
 Amrish Puri as Pasha
 Madan Puri as Bharat
 Bindu as Jamuna (Radha's widowed aunt)
 Bharat Bhushan as Ramu
 Shakti Kapoor as Jimmy Thapa
 Urmila Bhatt as Sandhya Mathur
 Shaikh Azad as Shaikh Faruk

Reception
The film was declared a "blockbuster" at the Indian box office, with Shroff and Sheshadri becoming stars after its release. Hero ran for 750 days in many cities in India. Both actors were in demand after its release and began a long association with Ghai. Younger audiences enjoyed the performances, and critics applauded Ghai for using fresh faces at a time when Amitabh Bachchan was the dominant star in Bollywood. The Yamaha Rajdoot 350 bike was heavily promoted in this movie.

Awards

 31st Filmfare Awards:

Nominated

 Best Music Director – Laxmikant–Pyarelal
 Best Female Playback Singer – Anuradha Paudwal for "Tu Mera Hero Hai"

Soundtrack
Composed by the musical duo Laxmikant Pyarelal with lyrics written by Anand Bakshi.

Track listing

Remakes

References

External links

1983 films
1980s Hindi-language films
Films scored by Laxmikant–Pyarelal
Indian romantic action films
Hindi films remade in other languages
Films directed by Subhash Ghai
Outlaw biker films
Indian films about revenge